Frontonia is a genus of free-living unicellular ciliate protists, belonging to the order Peniculida.  As Peniculids, the Frontonia are closely related to members of the genus Paramecium.   However, whereas Paramecia are mainly bacterivores, Frontonia are capable of ingesting large prey such as diatoms, filamentous algae, testate amoebas, and even, in some circumstances, members of their own species. In bacteria-rich saprobic conditions, Frontonia leucas can live as a facultative bacterivore.

Frontonia are widely dispersed, and members of the genus can be found in marine and freshwater environments on every continent.

Appearance and characteristics

Frontonia species vary in length from 50 to 600 micrometres.  Cell bodies are typically ovoid or elongate, and somewhat flattened from back to front.  They are flexible, uniformly ciliated, and usually surrounded by trichocysts.  The small oral aperture is pear-shaped, and located in the anterior half of the cell.  Along the left side of the opening there are three membranelles, and the right has a single paroral membrane.   The mouth is supported by inconspicuous microtubular rods (nematodesmata), and may expand during feeding to as much as two-thirds of the cell's length.

The cytoplasm of some species, such as Frontonia atra and Frontonia acuminata, can be darkly pigmented.

Classification
The genus Frontonia, created by C. G. Ehrenberg in 1838, includes some thirty named and described species.

In 2008, analysis of small subunit rRNA gene sequences confirmed the close relationship of several members of the genus: Frontonia leucas, F. vernalis, F. tchibisovae, F. lynni.  However, Frontonia didieri was found to be related more closely to a species from another genus, Apofrontonia dohrni.  This result calls into question the monophyly of the genus Frontonia, and also casts doubt on the morphological criteria used to distinguish Apofrontonia from it.

Image gallery

Video gallery

List of accepted species names

References

Oligohymenophorea
Ciliate genera
Taxa named by Christian Gottfried Ehrenberg
Articles containing video clips